Knipowitschia milleri, the Acheron Spring goby, is a species of goby endemic to Greece where it can be found in nearly stagnant, clear, fresh to very slightly brackish waters with abundant weed growth.  This species can reach a length of  SL.

Description 
The largest recorded specimen was 2.6 centimeters long, the oldest recorded specimen was two years old.

Distribution and ecology 
It is restricted to the river Acheron delta in Greece. It is found in fresh and slightly brackish waters, often with abundant vegetation, and sand or mud substrates.

References

Acheron spring goby
Freshwater fish of Europe
Endemic fauna of Greece
Fish described in 1990
Epirus (region)
Taxonomy articles created by Polbot